The units of the Arkansas Militia in the Civil War to which the current Arkansas National Guard has a connection include the Arkansas State Militia, Home Guard, and State Troop regiments raised by the State of Arkansas. Like most of the United States, Arkansas had an organized militia system before the American Civil War. State law required military service of most male inhabitants of a certain age. Following the War with Mexico, the Arkansas militia experienced a decline, but as sectional frictions between the north and south began to build in the late 1850s the militia experienced a revival. By 1860 the state's militia consisted of 62 regiments divided into eight brigades, which comprised an eastern division and a western division. New regiments were added as the militia organization developed. Additionally, many counties and cities raised uniformed volunteer companies, which drilled more often and were better equipped than the un-uniformed militia. These volunteer companies were instrumental in the seizure of federal installations at Little Rock and Fort Smith, beginning in February 1861.

Once Arkansas left the Union in May 1861, the existing volunteer militia companies were among the first mustered into state service and be formed into new volunteer infantry regiments, also referred to as "State Troops". These new regiments comprised the Provisional Army of Arkansas. In July 1861 and agreement was reached to transfer the existing state forces into the Confederate army. The Second Division of the Army of Arkansas was transferred to the Confederate Army under the command of General William E. Hardee, but before the First Division of the Army of Arkansas could be transferred, it participated in the Battle of Wilson's Creek near Springfield, Missouri, in August 1861. Following the battle of Wilson's Creek, the First Division voted to disband rather than enter Confederate Service.

In November 1861, Colonel Solon S. Borland, commanding Confederate forces at Pittman's Ferry received information regarding an imminent invasion of Northeast Arkansas and issued an immediate call for Militia forces to re-enforce his position. The State Military Board authorized the activation of Eighth Brigade of Militia, and one company from the militia regiments of Prairie, Monroe, Poinsett, Saint Francis, and Craighead counties. The units that responded to this call were formed into three regiments of 30 Day Volunteers. Some of these companies later enrolled in regular Confederate service.

In the spring of 1862 a Union invasion of Northwest Arkansas necessitated an activation of parts of the state militia. In February 1862, General McCulloch issued a proclamation from Fayetteville requesting that "every man turn out and form companies, and rally to meet the advancing enemy". Brigadier General N. B. Burrow, commander of the 3rd Brigade, 1st Division, Arkansas State Militia reacted by activating his entire brigade consisting of six regiments for approximately three weeks. Later in the Summer of 1862, when Major General Hindman assumed command of the Department of the Trans-Mississippi, the militia regiments were required to provide volunteers for new Confederate regiments or face conscription.

After the fall of Little Rock to Union forces in September 1863, Governor Harris Flanagin ordered out the militia regiments of Clark, Hempstead, Sevier, Pike, Polk, Montgomery, La Fayette, Ouachita, Union, and Columbia counties and directed them to supply mounted companies for new regiments of State Troops. This recruiting method succeeded in supplying several new mounted companies which participated in resisting Union General Steele's Camden Expedition in the spring of 1864. Sporadic recruiting of new volunteer companies from the Militia continued until March 1865.

The Arkansas Secession Convention directed each county to organize a Home Guard organization, which was intended to include old men and boys who were otherwise disqualified from active service. The Home Guard were later commissioned to begin guerrilla operations against occupying Union forces. Once Union forces secured the state capitol in 1863, the new loyal state government immediately began raising new loyal militia forces in an attempt to combat bands of guerrillas and bushwhackers operating behind Union lines.

The Marion County War
Two famous Arkansas veterans of the War with Mexico would find themselves deeply involved in the first use of the Arkansas Militia following the War with Mexico. Allen Wood, who had raised a volunteer company in Arkansas which became part of the 12th United States Infantry Regiment during the war with Mexico, was appointed as Adjutant General in 1849. On September 16, 1848, Governor John Sheldon Roane, himself a former Lieutenant Colonel in the Arkansas Regiment of Mounted Volunteers during the war with Mexico, ordered General Wood to investigate a state of unrest that existed in Marion County in 1849. Two warring families and their supporters vied for control of all county offices in what was known as the Tutt–Everett War. The Tutts, of the Whig Party and the Everetts, of the Democratic Party had a long running feud which erupted into bloodshed in June 1849. It was said that virtually every man in the county had taken sides in the affair. General Wood raised two militia companies in Carroll County, one commanded by Captain William C. Mitchell, the other by Captain Tilford Denton to assist with the capture of members of the Everetts clan and to guard the jail. General Wood relieved Sheriff Jesse Mooney, who was thought to be a member of the Everett faction and took over the county jail in Yellville. The force was eventually reduced to one company of 75 men who remained in the county from September 1849 through December 1849. Almost as soon as General Wood dismissed his militia companies, members of the Everett clan broke the prisoners out of jail. General Wood resigned the office of Adjutant General in a letter to the Governor dated July 28, 1851. On December 21, 1850, the Arkansas Legislature finally passed an act to pay for the militia called into service by General Wool. It is likely that the experience of calling out the militia for the Marion County War lead to the passage in 1852 of a law styled "an Act to provide for the organization of the Militia when called to suppress insurrections. This law allowed the county sheriff to order elections for offices of companies activated for this purpose.

Antebellum militia on the eve of conflict
With the conclusion of the Mexican–American War, the Arkansas militia fell into a state of disorganization. Without a threat from Mexico or the Indians, it seemed Arkansans needed protection from no one. Election of militia officers in most counties had basically stopped by 1849. Throughout much of the 1850s the Arkansas militia was practically dead; company and regimental musters were held infrequently, and officers stopped performing their duties. Governor Elias Conway, in an address to the state legislature dated November 7, 1854, stated that the state militia had not filed a single annual status report with the War Department since 1843. Without these reports, the militia did not receive its quota of Federal arms and equipment. One Little Rock newspaper editor wrote in 1852:

Elias N. Conway, elected governor in 1854, came from a prominent family of Arkansas politicians, some of whom had served in the militia during its earlier and more active years. The condition of the Arkansas Militia when Governor Conway began his revival may best be summarized by a letter to the Governor from Col. Henry Rieff, Commander of the 20th Regiment Arkansas Militia dated January 3, 1860:

Governor Conway pushed the legislature to revise the militia laws and successfully sparked a renewed interest in the militia. He commissioned a printing of a digest of the militia laws of Arkansas in 1860. A review of the election returns for militia officers in each county in 1860 and the spring of 1861 provide some indication of the success of Governor Conway's attempt to revitalize the organization of the state militia. The militia was organized into two divisions of four brigades each. Each county supplied at least one regiment, and companies were normally organized in each township. Several counties had more than one regiment and one, Lawrence County, had three militia regiments. Regimental and company officers were elected at the annual muster. The election results were forwarded to the Governor either by the regimental commander or by the county clerk. The exact strength of these units is unclear. In May 1860, Col. George M. Holt, commander of the 18th Regiment from Saline County, claimed to have 1,000 to 1,200 men available and requested that the county be granted permission to form a second regiment.

Militia vs. volunteer companies 
The Militia Law of Arkansas as published in 1860 provided for a two-tiered militia system. Section one of the law made all able-bodied free white male inhabitants between the ages of 18 and 45 liable for service. The militiamen were required to provide their own weapons and equipment and were to muster four times annually, including two company drills, one battalion muster, and one regimental muster. No provision was made for uniforms for the private militiamen, while officers were required to acquire and wear the uniform of the United States Army. Additionally, section 57 of the act allowed each county to raise up to four Volunteer Companies. These Volunteer Companies were to be either infantry, riflemen, cavalry, or artillery. While the Volunteer Companies were to be separate from the regular militia units, they remained under the supervision and authority of the local militia regimental commander, who was required to set the time and place of the election of officers for volunteer companies and certify their election to the governor. Volunteer Companies were required to drill at least once per month (although the Pulaski Artillery, a Volunteer Artillery Company organized in Little Rock in December 1860, scheduled drill three times a week). Volunteer Companies were allowed to select and acquire their own uniforms and their officers were authorized to wear the uniform of the company. While the standard militia units were organized into lettered companies organized roughly along township boundaries, Volunteer Companies usually adopted colorful names to set them apart. Membership in the Volunteer Companies was encouraged by the provision that once a militiaman had completed five years service in a Volunteer Company, he was exempted from further militia service.

In a letter "To The Militiamen Of The State Of Arkansas" dated August 27, 1860, Governor Conway exhorted the raising of additional volunteer companies:

He commented that if all the volunteer companies authorized by the act were to be raised, the state would have a force of 22,000 volunteers. He explained that the general assembly had yet to pass a law allowing the state to provide arms for all the volunteer companies, and he encouraged the counties to consider taxing themselves in order to raise the funds.

Although several Volunteer Companies were already in existence at various locations around the state, the Governor's call sparked a wave of formations. State newspapers in the summer and fall of 1860 have several stories of volunteer companies being formed, drilling, and participating in the regular muster of the militia regiments. The leaders of these volunteer companies began to search for uniforms and equipment, often requesting them through militia channels to the Governor, but then turning to private sources when the State Government was unable to help. The state legislature responded to the need for arms and equipment in January 1861 by appropriating $100,000 for the arming and equipping of the militia being formed into volunteer companies. Act Number 192, which was approved on January 21, 1861, appropriated money "for the purpose of arming the volunteer militia of this state, when formed into volunteer military companies..."

In the beginning, these companies continued to operate under the authority of the local militia commander, with the local regimental commander overseeing the election of officers and forwarding the election results to the Governor. After the state actually seceded in May 1861, Volunteer Companies and Regiments would be raised under the authority of the State Military Board, or directly by Confederate Government authorities.

The readiness of the Militia organizations was compared to that of the Volunteer Companies springing up around the state when the Crawford County Militia, the 5th Regiment Arkansas Militia, conducted its annual muster and drill on February 23, 1861, at Van Buren. They were joined on this occasion by two companies of volunteers, the Frontier Guards (led by Captain Hugh Thomas Brown) and the Independent Light Horse Guards (under Captain Powhatan Perkins). The two independent companies received rave reviews for their drill, but the performance of the 5th Militia Regiment provoked the following report from the Van Buren Press:

A more favorable account comes from a report on the September 1860 muster of Pulaski County's 13th Militia Regiment:

Following the parade of the 13th Regiment, Brigadier General Holt and the regimental officers gathered in front of Governor Conway's home and heard a speech in which the governor complimented them "upon the revival, at a critical time, of the military spirit which once animated the people, but seemed long to have been dead."

In October an article appeared in the same paper announcing a drill contest to be conducted as a part of a Fair scheduled for November 8–9, 1860, on the grounds of St John's College in Little Rock. The best-drilled militia company was to receive a "Premium".

Volunteer companies organized in the state militia
This list includes volunteer militia companies which were organized in accordance with Section 57 of the 1860 Militia Law, by having the election of their company officers certified by the Colonel commanding the local militia regiment, or whose association with the local militia regiment can be documented through contemporary accounts.

Militia operations: Spring and Summer 1861

The secession crisis

Lincoln's victory in the presidential election of 1860 triggered South Carolina's declaration of secession from the Union. By February 1861, six more Southern states made similar declarations. On February 7, the seven states adopted a provisional constitution for the Confederate States of America and established their temporary capital at Montgomery, Alabama. A pre-war February Peace Conference of 1861 met in Washington in a failed attempt at resolving the crisis.

As the secession movement grew, people in Arkansas became greatly concerned. In January 1861 the General Assembly called an election for the people to vote on whether Arkansas should hold a convention to consider secession. At the same time the voters were to elect delegates to the convention in case the vote should be favorable. On February 18, 1861, Arkansans voted to call a secession convention, but elected mostly conditional unionist delegates.

Seizure of the Federal Arsenal at Little Rock

Anti-union forces began calling for the seizure of the Federal Arsenal in Little Rock. When rumors were circulated that the Federal Government intended to reinforce the troops at the Little Rock Arsenal, the leading citizens of Helena sent Governor Henry Massey Rector a telegram volunteering 500 men to assist in its seizure. Edmund Burgevin, adjutant general of the Arkansas State Militia, carried the message to the Governor. Burgevin complained of the impropriety of a direct offer of volunteers to the governor of a State which had not seceded, and might not secede. Governor Rector's response was:

In response to the Governor's message, Militia companies began assembling in Little Rock by February 5, 1861, and they made their intention to seize the Arsenal known to its commander, Captain Totten. The Yell Rifles, including future Confederate General Patrick Cleburne, and the Phillips County Guards (both of Phillips County), were the first companies to reach Little Rock and report to Governor Rector. Governor Rector denied having called the militia forces, and sent the newly arriving companies into camps near the present state capitol building. In addition to the two Phillips County Companies, the Jefferson Guards of Pine Bluff, the Southwestern Guards, and the LaGrange Cavalry responded to the call to seize the Arsenal. Eventually more than a thousand men would assemble, representing Phillips, Jefferson, Prairie, White, Saline, Hot Spring, Montgomery, Monroe, and St Francis counties. Many citizens of Little Rock opposed the occupation of the Arsenal, fearing a loss of life and property. The Little Rock City Council reacted with alarm at this sudden invasion of the capitol by the newly formed volunteer companies and called out its own militia unit, the Capitol Guards, and ordered them to patrol the streets and stand guard over the volunteer companies. Although generally opposed to secession, the Little Rock City Council fear that a battle might ensure within the city itself and passed an ordinance requesting the Governor assume control of the assembling volunteer forces and to seize the Arsenal "to prevent the effusion of blood".

Governor Rector, now armed with the city council's request, took control of the military situation. The 13th Militia Regiment of Pulaski County was activated and Brigadier General Holt, the local militia brigade commander, was placed in command. With militia forces now surrounding the arsenal grounds, Governor Rector dispatched General Thomas D. Merrick, commander of the First Division, Arkansas Militia, with a formal demand for the Arsenal's surrender. Captain James Totten, Arsenal commander, agreed to evacuate the Arsenal in return for safe passage out of the state. Governor Rector agreed and the Militia took control of the Arsenal on February 8, 1861. Totten and his men were escorted from the city by the Capitol Guards. Grateful citizens of Little Rock presented him a sword, which some later came to regret; Totten would eventually meet Arkansas troops on the field of battle. Later, artillery batteries were set up at Helena on the Mississippi River and Pine Bluff on the Arkansas to prevent reinforcement of Federal military posts.

The Yell Rifles returned to Helena, and then moved to Camp Rector, at Mound City, (near present-day West Memphis, Arkansas) where they mustered into state service as Company A, 1st Arkansas Infantry, State Troops. Cleburne was eventually elected to command the new regiment. The Phillips Guards under the command of Captain George Otey, remained in Little Rock to provide a garrison for the newly seized Arsenal.

The first Convention on Secession

On March 4, 1861, Abraham Lincoln was sworn in as president. In his inaugural address, he argued that the Constitution was a "more perfect union" than the earlier Articles of Confederation and Perpetual Union, that it was a binding contract, and called any secession "legally void". He stated he had no intent to invade the Southern states, nor did he intend to end slavery where it existed, but that he would use force to maintain possession of federal property. His speech closed with a plea for restoration of the bonds of union.

The next day, the Arkansas Secession Convention convened in the State House in Little Rock. David Walker, who opposed secession, was elected president. The convention continued in session for two and a half weeks. Feeling ran high and many fiery speeches were made, but it soon became evident that a majority of the members did not think that the situation at that time called for secession. The convention voted down a resolution condemning Lincoln's inaugural address, and defeated a conditional ordinance of secession. The opinion seemed to prevail that Arkansas should secede only if the Federal government made war on the Confederate States. Still hoping for a compromise settlement that would avoid war, the delegates agreed to go home until after the people had voted on the secession question at a special election to be held in August.

Arkansas leaves the Union
Fort Monroe in Virginia, Fort Sumter in Charleston, South Carolina, and Fort Pickens, Fort Jefferson, and Fort Taylor, in Florida, were the remaining Union-held forts in the Confederacy, and Lincoln was determined to hold them all. Under orders from Confederate President Jefferson Davis, troops controlled by the Confederate government under P. G. T. Beauregard bombarded Fort Sumter on April 12, forcing its capitulation. Northerners rallied behind Lincoln's call for all the states to send troops to recapture the forts and to preserve the Union, citing presidential powers given by the Militia Acts of 1792. President Lincoln called upon the "militia of the several states" to provide 75,000 troops to put down the rebellion. For months before that, several Northern governors had discreetly readied their state militias; they began to move forces the next day.
The first Arkansas Secession Convention had pledged the state to "Resist to the last extremity any attempt on the part of such power (President Lincoln) to coerce any state that had succeeded from the old Union". In spite of the fact that Arkansas had yet to officially secede, a militia battalion was quickly organized under the command of Solon F. Borland. The force, including the Pulaski Lancers, the Capitol Guards, the Pulaski Light Artillery, and Captain Daniel Ringo's Peyton Rifles (all associated with the 13th Militia Regiment, Pulaski County) was dispatched to seize the Federal Arsenal at Fort Smith on April 23, 1861.

The Adjutant General, Edmond Burgevin, provided the state's response to the War Department's demand for troops:

Faced with President Lincoln's demand for troops, the Secession Convention reconvened in Little Rock and, on May 6, 1861, passed the ordinance of secession by a vote of 69 to 1. Future Governor Isaac Murphy was the only "No" vote.

The Pulaski Light Artillery was initially assigned to garrison the captured arsenal at Fort Smith. Brigadier General Napoleon Bonapart Burrows, commander of the 8th Brigade, Arkansas Militia was sent to Fort Smith, where he began negotiations with the Chickasaw Nation to occupy Federal forts in the Indian Territory.

Organizing Arkansas State Troops
The Secession Convention continued to meet and began the process of drafting a new state constitution and ordering the state's military affairs. The new constitution sought to limit the power of the Governor by vesting authority for military matters in a three-person board chaired by the Governor. The Military Board was to oversee the organization of a state army; to arm, feed, and clothe the troops; and to call out the forces for such military expeditions as might be necessary to defend the state. The military board was composed of Governor Rector, Christopher C. Danley of Little Rock, and Benjamin C. Totten of Prairie County. Danley was soon replaced by Samuel W. Williams, who was replaced in turn by L. D. Hill of Perry County.
The Secession Convention also adopted an ordinance providing for the organization of an "Army of Arkansas". The Army was to consist of two divisions: the 1st Division in the western portion of the state and the 2nd Division in the eastern portion of the state. Each division was to be commanded by a brigadier general. While called "divisions", the formations were actually intended to be of brigade size, with each being composed of four regiments of infantry and two artillery batteries. The ordinance required each regiment to consist of not less than six companies and not more than 10. Each company was to consist of not less than 64 men and not more than 96 men and four officers. The officers were to be elected by the men of the regiment. $2 million was appropriated to fund the Board.

The Convention elected three of its members as commanders of the new army: Major General James Yell of Jefferson County (overall commander) Nicholas Bartlett Pearce, a graduate of West Point and resident of Benton County (commander of the First Division), and Thomas H. Bradley of Crittenden County (commander of the Second Division). Historian Leo Huff has referred to these commanders as "three political generals"; however, each had some connection to the militia. Major General Yell had served as the commander of the 2nd Division of the Arkansas Militia, Brigadier General Pearce had served as the Colonel of the Benton County Militia Regiment, and Brigadier General Thomas H. Bradley had previously served as a major general in the Tennessee Militia. General Pearce, who had graduated from West Point, had the most military training of the three generals. But all three of these men did harm to the war effort by opposing the transfer of Arkansas troops to a unified Confederate command. Eventually, all three men were either relieved of their command or transferred to other activities.

The Secession Convention enacted an ordinance on May 30, 1861, that called upon all the counties in the State to appoint a "home guard of minute men" for local defense, until regular military regiments could be raised and deployed. These Home Guard units were made up of old men and boys who were not eligible for normal military service. Like the Militia, the Home Guard units were organized at the county level, with companies being supplied by each township. Originally these units were intended to be separate from the state militia. Most counties presumably complied with the law, but records of only a few of these 1861 home guard organizations can now be found. The Independence County Home Guard was established in accordance with this new ordinance. The Independence County Court, in special session, established and made appointments to the local home guard organization on June 29, 1861. Subsequent appointments were made in July, October, and November 1861. About 220 men were appointed in all the townships of the county. Most of them were property owners, many quite prominent and wealthy, and, as far as can be determined, all were over the conscript age. Some were quite elderly. Despite their age, wealth, and social position, many later served in regular Confederate units in the latter part of the war, especially in Dobbin's and Morgan's cavalry regiments. John Farrell Allen was appointed General Commander of the Independence County Home Guard.

Mobilizing forces

Militia leaders were hopeful that their existing formations would be mobilized and utilized to defend the state. Brigadier General Jett, commanding the 1st Brigade, Arkansas Militia even wrote directly to Confederate President Jefferson Davis and offered the services of his brigade, which he described as "all officered and ready for action except in arms and munitions of war." The Secession Convention had other plans: they intended for the militia to remain separate from the Confederate forces. The existing militia organizations were to be retained as a source of manpower and a last-ditch defense network. This resulted in many local militia company commanders volunteering their existing forces as new volunteer companies rather than organizing separate Confederate companies.

Efforts to mobilize the state's forces were subject to the competing interest of the State Military Board. The board recognized the need to quickly mobilize troops to defend the state, but wished to avoid as much of the cost of the mobilization as possible. Additionally the Military Board feared that troops raised to defend the state would be diverted into the eastern theater of operations by the Confederate government. This concern quickly proved valid. The board made a decision not to mobilize the existing state militia regiments, and instead began organizing new volunteer regiments. The existing militia law authorized volunteer companies to be organized into regiments and brigades of volunteer troops. The regiments are also referred to as "State Troops" in state records from the period. Existing Volunteer Companies, already organized in the militia, were inducted into these new volunteer regiments. The militia regiments would maintain a separate identity from the State Troops and later Confederate regiments.

The board dispatched Christopher C. Danley of Little Rock to Richmond to open negotiations with the new Confederate government for the transfer of State Troops to the Confederate government. The Board immediately issued a call for 10,000 troops (10 regiments). Acting under the militia law's authority to organize volunteer regiments, Governor Rector had already directed volunteer units to begin organizing, so the first seven regiments were already in the process of organization when the military board issued its call for troops.

Much confusion exists in tracking the formation of military units during the initial months of the war because several different governments (Confederate, state, and county), all with competing interests, were raising troops within the state. The State Military Board was raising units which it hoped to transfer to Confederate service. James F. Fagan, T. B. Flournoy, and Albert Rust received authority directly from the new Confederate government to raise regiments for Confederate service. The War Department assigned the regimental designations of 1st Arkansas Volunteers (Fagan), 2nd Arkansas Volunteers (Hindman), and 3rd Arkansas Volunteers (Rust). The 1st and 3rd Arkansas Regiments organized, armed, and reported themselves ready for active service in May 1861, and received orders to report to Lynchburg, Virginia. Col. Hindman, however, had problems organizing his companies and obtaining arms, perhaps because the Arkansas State Troops were actively organizing in the same area. Col. Hindman's 2nd Arkansas Volunteers did not complete its organization and recruiting until June, and then had trouble getting orders from the War Department. Hindman's regiment was eventually sworn into state service and was then transferred to Confederate service with the rest of the eastern division of the Army of Arkansas.

The Military Board developed its own plan for numbering the regiments of State Troops, but this plan was apparently ignored by the new brigade commanders, who tended to number regiments sequentially based upon the date they were sworn into state service. The plan was also ignored by Confederate authorities, who often renumbered the regiments of State Troops when they were transferred into Confederate service, based on the date they were sworn into the Confederate Army. The result is a great deal of confusion regarding the designation of any particular Arkansas unit.

The 1st Arkansas Infantry, State Troops, commanded by Colonel Patrick R. Cleburne, was one of the first regiments created from the initial wave of Volunteer Companies. Of the eight companies which were inducted into state service as a part of this regiment at Mound City on May 14, 1861, seven had been originally organized as volunteer companies under the militia law. The regiment was initially mustered into the Confederate Army as the 1st Arkansas Volunteer Infantry, Confederate States Army. Later it was determined that another regiment had already received that designation. The unit recognized by the Confederate War Department as the 1st Arkansas Infantry was commanded by Col. James F. Fagan. Col. Fagan had served as a lieutenant with Company C of the Arkansas Regiment of Mounted Volunteers during the War with Mexico. Fagan's regiment was not mustered into state service, but left the state for the Eastern Theater; it was mustered into Confederate service in Lexington, Virginia. Col. Cleburne's 1st Arkansas Infantry, State Troops, was redesignated as the 15th Arkansas Infantry. The confusion did not end there, because a total of three Arkansas Infantry regiments were eventually named the "15th", the first being the aforementioned 1st Arkansas Infantry, State Troops commanded by Col. Cleburne. The new 15th Arkansas moved into camp with the 2nd Division of the Army of Arkansas, under the field command of Major General Yell, in Pocahontas.

Volunteer militia companies enlisted in Confederate service
The following volunteer companies who were formed under the authority of the antebellum militia laws were inducted into the new regiments of State Troops or directly into Confederate Service:

Order of battle, Provisional Army of Arkansas

The new Army of Arkansas was to consist of two divisions: the 1st Division, covering western Arkansas, and the 2nd Division in the eastern half of the state. A major general was to command the Army, while each division was to be under the command of a brigadier general. Each regiment was to consist of six to 10 companies. As was tradition, company officers were elected by the men and regimental officers were elected by the company officers.

Brigadier General Thomas Bradely, who initially commanded the eastern or 2nd Division, was quickly relieved of command after a dispute with Col. Cleburne. Major General Yell assumed command of the 2nd (Eastern) Division and had the following units under his command:

1st Regiment, Arkansas State Troops, (15th Josey's Volunteer Infantry)
5th Regiment (Cross's Regiment), Arkansas State Troops, (5th Arkansas Volunteer Infantry, Confederate States Army)
6th Regiment, Arkansas State Troops, (6th Arkansas Volunteer Infantry, Confederate States Army)
7th Regiment, Arkansas State Troops, (7th Arkansas Volunteer Infantry, Confederate States Army)
Helena Artillery (Key's Battery)
Jackson Light Artillery (McCown's Battery)
Clark County Artillery (Roberts Battery)

Brigadier General Pearce assumed command of the 1st (Western) Division and had the following units under his direct command:
3rd Regiment, Arkansas State Troops, (Gratiot's Regiment)
4th Regiment, Arkansas State Troops, (Walker's Regiment)
5th Regiment, Arkansas State Troops, (Dockery's Regiment)
1st Cavalry Regiment, Arkansas State Troops (Carroll's Regiment)
Pulaski Light Artillery, (Woodruff's Battery).
Fort Smith Artillery, (Ried's Battery)

On July 14, 1861, Confederate Brigadier General William J. Hardee arrived in Little Rock to assume unified Confederate command in the state. The following day the state Military Board signed an "Article of Transfer", which provided that all state forces (excepting the militia), some 10,000 men, would be transferred on a voluntary basis to the command of the Confederate States of America. All weapons, ammunition, and supplies were also to be transferred. Before the transfer could take place, Arkansas State Troops got their first taste of real battle.

State troops and the Battle of Wilson's Creek

Brigadier General Pearce, who lived in Benton County, established the headquarters, 1st Division, Provisional Army of Arkansas at Camp Walker at Maysville. Thus when a Union army began operating around Springfield in Southwest Missouri, Pearce's state troops were nearby. Pearce's troops, which are referred to as a brigade of State Troops in the official accounts of the battle, numbered 2,234 troops. Pearce agreed to co-operate with Brigadier General Benjamin McCulloch and his force of about 8,000 other soldiers from several commands, to form a sizable force and immediately marched toward Springfield. On August 10, 1861, Brigadier General Nathaniel Lyon, the forceful commander of Union troops in Missouri, attacked the Confederates. The ensuing day-long battle was fought on a number of fronts. Captain William E. Woodruff, Jr., commander of the Pulaski Light Artillery, engaged in a fierce artillery duel with Captain James Totten, who had only a few months earlier surrendered the Federal Arsenal at Little Rock. Captain Totten found himself with an opportunity to gain revenge, and his cannons roared throughout the day.

The Battle of Wilson's Creek came to an abrupt and inglorious halt when the Union commander was killed. Leaderless and outnumbered five-to-one, the bluecoats fled the battlefield. The Arkansas troops played a major role in winning the battle, but paid a heavy price for victory. Two Arkansas units suffered particularly heavy casualties. Colonel Thomas J. Churchill's 1st Arkansas Mounted Rifles counted 42 killed and 155 wounded out of 600 men. Colonel John Gratiot's 3rd Arkansas Infantry, State Troops suffered 109 casualties, including 25 killed, out of a force of 500 men.

Pearce's Troops vote to disband

Shortly after the Battle of Wilson's Creek, Pearce's troops were polled as to whether they wanted to be transferred to Confederate command as had been arranged prior to the battle. Brig. Gen. Pearce actively campaigned against joining the Confederate States Army. Sources differ as to how many of these Arkansas state troops agreed to the transfer. It appears that few were willing to continue in either service. Colonel Gratiot's command voted en masse against the transfer, and they were marched back to southwest Arkansas, where they were mustered out of state service on September 19, 1861. By the end of September 1861, all organized state troops had either been transferred to Confederate command or mustered out of state service.

Arkansas Confederates transferred east of the river

Between July 2 and August 1, 1861, eight regiments were organized by the Military Board. By November 1861 Governor Rector reported that 21 regiments had been raised, a total of 16,000 men, and an additional 6,000 men were soon to be in the ranks.

The Secession Convention and Military Board fears of Arkansas troops being transferred east of the Mississippi quickly became a reality. Brigadier General William J. Hardee led his new brigade of Arkansas Troops on a short uneventful raid into Missouri, and then transferred the command east of the Mississippi to join what would become the Confederate Army of Tennessee. Arkansas soon found itself virtually defenseless. By insisting that all state troops have the right to approve their transfer to Confederate service, state authorities had effectively killed the chance of raising a large unified force in the state. Governor Rector's newspaper charged: "The Confederate government has abandoned Arkansas to her fate."

Militia operations: Fall 1861

Col. Borland calls for militia to defend Northeast Arkansas: November 1861

In May 1861, Pocahontas and the nearby strategically important Pitman's Ferry, in Randolph County, became an important Confederate military depot. Following the transfer of the State Troop regiments to Brig. Gen Hardee, virtually all the regiments stationed in northeast Arkansas were transferred in late September east of the Mississippi River to Bowling Green, Kentucky. Col. Solon Borland was left in command of a small force at Pitman's Ferry. Col. Borland's force was the only defense left in Northeast Arkansas. The forces included: Borland's own cavalry regiment of seven companies, Col. McCown's five companies of infantry, Maj. Desha's four companies of raw troops, Capt. Robert's artillery unit of 60 men but no guns and about 150 recruits brought by Maj. McCray – altogether about 1286 men. But of these, owing to sickness and casualties Col Borland said he could count on no more than 600 for fighting service, and all were "raw, inexperienced, poorly disciplined and indifferently armed."

A second round of recruiting for new regiments was just getting underway when Col. Borland began receiving reports of enemy movements in Missouri. The initial reports seemed to indicate a possible movement on Pitman's Ferry. The Union army was massing troops in southeast Missouri mainly for the purpose of a thrust down the Mississippi River. But this posed a very real threat to all areas of northeast Arkansas. Col Borland indicated that he had reliable information "that there are 300 infantry and 150 cavalry at Rives' Station, on Black River, 35 miles north of Pitman's Ferry. Also that there is a strong infantry force-7,000-at Greenville, 15 miles north of Rives' Station." Borland was maintaining a regular correspondence with Brig Gen. M. Jeff Thompson, of the Missouri State Guard, who commanded the First Military District of Missouri at Bloomfield, Missouri.

Reports of these Union troop movements were sent to area militia units. The Jacksonport Herald of October 26, 1861, published a communication received by Christopher W. Board, Commander of the 34th Militia Regiment of Jackson County.

Col. Borland moved his command from Pitman's Ferry to Pocahontas and was sufficiently alarmed over the reports to issue a call for reinforcements from the militia. On November 5, 1861, Col. Borland issued an appeal for volunteers in the surrounding counties to hastily organize companies for the defense of Pitman's Ferry until new regular Confederate regiments could be organized and dispatched.

When news of Borland's situation reached Little Rock, the state Military Board responded to Borland's call for aid by calling out the 8th Militia Brigade under the command of Brig. Gen. Phillips:

Brig. Gen. Theodore H. Phillips offered his services to Col. Borland, who welcomed his aid in the emergency. Phillips undertook the organization of the new 30 day volunteer companies into a brigade. He placed a requisition for camp equipment as follows:

Brig. Gen Phillips added his explanation for the requisition: "In response to Col. Borland's call for militia service for 30 days. We have responded and entered service. [with] Capt. Ruffner." The receipt was dated Pocahontas November 23. 1861, and was signed by "T. H. Phillips, Brig. Gen. 8th Brigade of Arkansas Militia."

Col. Borland's call received an almost immediate response, but he continued to harbor serious misgivings about his situation. On November 10, he wrote to Maj. Gen. Leonidas Polk, C.S.A., commanding the 1st Division Western Department, at Columbus, Kentucky, and told of his call for reinforcements from the militia. He said the response was "somewhat tumultuous." On November 9, 1000 men had arrived unorganized and so ill-supplied with arms that be deemed it best to direct them to return home. They followed this direction and assured Borland that within a week's time he would have at least 3000 men at his command. He told them that companies thus organized and prepared would be received into service for 30 days from the time they reported again to him. Borland added a postscript to this letter, saying that he had just received a report from his scouts that a Federal force of 7450 was between Reeve's Station and Greenville in Missouri. He told Gen. Polk that the force he had was wholly insufficient for either attack or defense. It should be three times as large or be abandoned altogether; and finally he asked to be relieved of his command. "It is a Brigadier's command, and should have his responsibility, which I am daily growing more and more distrustful of my competency to sustain. Public interests here would be better provided for by other and abler hands."

News of Borland's call for volunteers and the resulting convergence upon Pocahontas was of course reported to other parts of the state. The Arkansas True Democrat of November 14 printed a dispatch from Des Arc dated November 9, 11:00 pm:

Some two dozen of these emergency companies were organized in Greene, Independence, Izard, Jackson, Lawrence and Randolph counties, including the areas now encompassed in present-day Clay, Cleburne, Sharp and Woodruff counties. They converged on Pocahontas and Pitman's Ferry, beginning about November 9, and were mustered into Confederate service for a period of thirty days. Few records of these hastily organized and short-lived companies have survived. It appears that three thirty-day regiments were organized from these companies.

1st Arkansas Regiment, 30 Day Volunteers, CSA

The 1st Arkansas Regiment, 30-Day Volunteers (infantry), seems to have been formally organized on November 23, 1861—at least that is the date of the appointments of the field and staff officers—under command of Colonel James Haywood McCaleb. Col. McCaleb was the commander of the 25th Militia Regiment, form Lawrence County. It appears that several of the companies that composed the new "30 Day Volunteer" regiment originated as part of the 25th Militia Regiment:

 Company A – Capt. A. G. Kelsey—Randolph and Lawrence counties.
 Company B – Capt. John W. Peter—Sharp, Independence and Izard counties.
 Company C – Capt. M. Shelby Kennard—Independence county.
 Company D – Capt. Thomas S. Simington—Randolph county.
 Company E – Capt. Joshua Wann—Lawrence (present day Sharp) county.
 Company F – Capt. Israel Milligan—Lawrence (present day Sharp) and Izard counties.
 Company G – Capt. Daniel Yeager—Lawrence (present day Sharp) county.
 Company H – Capt. James Campbell Anderson—Greene (and present day Clay) counties.
 Company I – Capt. Beverly B. Owens—Independence county.
 Company K – Capt. L. W. Robertson—Lawrence (and present day Sharp) counties.

2nd Arkansas Regiment, 30 Day Volunteers, CSA

The 2nd Regiment Arkansas Regiment, 30-Day Volunteers (infantry), may not have completed its organization—only the records of one battalion of this regiment have survived. Only the records of the four companies of the 1st Battalion of the 2nd Regiment are extant. Four companies from northeast Arkansas constituted the 1st Battalion. The companies enlisted for 30-days of emergency service on November 18, and were discharged on December 18, 1861:

 Company A – Capt. John H. Miers' company from Jackson County.
 Company B – Capt. W. T. High's company ("High's Repellers") from Prairie (and present-day Lonoke) counties. This company appears to have originated as Company G, 50th Militia Regiment of Prairie County.
 Company C – Capt. James R. Morris' company from Independence and present-day Cleburne counties, and
 Company D – Capt. Thomas G. Shinpock's company from present-day Woodruff County.

The men of Companies A, B and C returned to their respective homes after being discharged. The men of Company D stayed on to enlist in Confederate service for one year and became Company K of McCarver's 14th Arkansas Infantry. No colonel or lieutenant-colonel was ever assigned to the 2nd Regiment. The only field-grade officer mentioned in the record is a Major Allen, commanding the 1st Battalion, 2nd Regiment.

3rd Arkansas Regiment, 30 Day Volunteers, CSA

A 3rd Arkansas Regiment, 30-Day Volunteers (cavalry), almost surely never completely organized—only the rosters of two mounted companies, under Captains Reves and Hooker, have survived.

 Capt. Reves' Mounted Company, 30-Day Volunteers, CSA – from Randolph County. Notation on muster roll—"This company was raised in Randolph county, Arkansas, in response to Colonel Borland's call of November 5, 1861, mustered into the Confederate service on December 26, 1861, for 30 days, and discharged on January 26, 1862, at Pocahontas, Arkansas.".
 Capt. Richard Hooker's Company, Arkansas Mounted Volunteers, 30 days 1861, CSA – Jackson County. This company was mustered into Confederate service November 29, and discharged December 28, 1861. Muster rolls for this period bear the remark: "the men were armed with shotguns and borrowed sabers." Hooker's Company began as a cavalry unit. They had evidently spent time training in camp at Jacksonport before going to Pocahontas. In a report of purchases of army equipment at Jacksonport for the military board, R. R. Kellogg wrote on December 20, 1861: "Enclosed please find an Invoice of Goods by the Committee for Jackson County at this place – together with the receipts of all that we have distributed. The tents loaned to Hooker's Company have been returned and are now subject to your order." Although Hooker's Company was originally organized for 30 day service, it was reorganized on February 26, 1862, by Capt. Hooker at Jacksonport and more men were added. It figured prominently in actions around Jackson County in the spring and summer of 1862. Hooker's Company was mustered into it Confederate service as companies C and D of the 32nd Arkansas Infantry Regiment.

Unattached companies
Four additional companies were raised, possibly to fill out the rest of the 2nd Regiment or possibly for the 3rd Regiment of 30 day Volunteers, but they were never formally assigned to a regiment.

 Capt. Clayton's Company, 30-Day Volunteers, CSA—From Lawrence (Now Sharp) county. Notation on muster roll—"This company was raised at Ash Flat, Arkansas, in response to Colonel Borland's call of November 5, 1861, mustered into the Confederate service on November 9, 1861, for 30 days, and discharged on December 9, 1861, at Pitman's Ferry, Arkansas."
 Capt. Ballard's Company, 30-Day Volunteers, CSA – from Randolph county, Notation on muster roll—"This company was raised in Randolph county, Arkansas, in response to Colonel Borland's call of November 5, 1861, mustered into the Confederate service on November 17, 1861, for 30 days, and discharged on December 17, 1861, at Pitman's Ferry, Arkansas."
 Capt. Baker's Company, 30-Day Volunteers, CSA – from St Francis county. Notation on muster roll—"This company was raised at Cotton Plant, Arkansas, in response to Colonel Borland's call of November 5, 1861, mustered into the Confederate service on November 14, 1861, for 30 days, and discharged on December 14, 1861, at Pocahontas, Arkansas."
 Capt. Ruffner commanded a company of volunteers from the southern part of Lawrence County and evidently camped with Gen. Phillips. They remained at Pocahontas until the emergency was over and Col. Borland felt their service was no longer needed.

The period of enlistment for these emergency companies expired from mid-December to early January, about the time that the new regular regiments arrived, and they were discharged and sent home. Most of the volunteers subsequently enlisted in various regiments organized in the third round of troop mobilization in March and April 1862.

Operations against the Peace Society

The 45th Regiment Arkansas Militia was the regiment of Searcy and present-day Stone counties. It is the only militia regiment known to have been called up during the war for a specific mission. Confederate and State authorities became increasingly concerned about a shadowy organization in north-central Arkansas known as the Peace Society. The Peace Societies were largely union sympathizers who felt that the large slaveholding planters of southern Arkansas and the deep South had caused the war; they felt that they should be required to bear the burden of the conflict. Governor Rector ordered the 45th Arkansas Militia Regiment (Searcy County) to round up suspected Peace Society members in Searcy and Van Buren counties.

The regiment mustered on November 26, 1861, at Burrowville (now Marshall), and spent the next few weeks identifying and apprehending suspected Peace Society members throughout the mountains of north-central Arkansas. Finally, in mid-December, the regiment "escorted" their prisoners to Little Rock, where most of them were forced into Confederate service. Companies I and K of Marmaduke's 18th Arkansas (later 3rd Confederate) regiment were composed primarily of men rounded up by the 45th Militia. Their mission completed, the regiment returned to Searcy County and mustered out on December 20, 1861. The next spring, most of them enlisted in the 27th and 32nd Arkansas Infantry Regiments.

Inspection of militia units December 1861

The Military Board's efforts to mobilize necessary forces to defend the state, while maintaining the Militia as a separate organization, appear to have still been successful in the fall and winter of 1861. In early December 1861, the commanding generals of the Arkansas Militia Brigades made inspection tours of their districts. The Adjutant General, General Edmund Burevin, reviewed the Militia Division of Major General Thomas D. Merrick, who had mobilized as the Colonel of the 10th Arkansas. Major General James Yell reviewed the 2nd Militia Division. Brigadier General Holt, 2nd Brigade, 1st Division, reported that the militia units in the eight counties that comprised the 2nd Brigade were well organized, and that domestic arms were more plentiful than he had expected. Regimental Drill was conducted on December 5, 1861, at St. Johns College in Little Rock, and on December 7 in Saline County.

Militia operations: 1862
The Confederate Government in Richmond reacted to Arkansas' complaints on January 10, 1862, by creating District of the Trans-Mississippi from General Albert Sidney Johnston's Department of the West and dispatching Major General Earl Van Dorn to assume command. General Van Dorn arrived in Little Rock on January 29, 1862, and immediately made a requisition upon the State Military Board for ten additional regiments of infantry and four companies of artillery. In a proclamation, "To The People Of Arkansas, dated January 31, 1862, Governor Rector commented that:

Under the Governor's Proclamation, the state was divided into four new "divisions" and each division was assigned a recruiting goal. Governor Rector warned that any division which failed to report the number of men to them by March 5, 1862, would be subject to a draft, by counties, until their due proportion according to population was furnished ... Rector also stated that the State Military Board had the authority "to make a draft from the militia to obtain the required number for service".

Militia called out in the face of invasion

Before Major General Van Dorn could make much progress at building his new "Army of the West", a Union invasion of Northwest Arkansas necissitated an activation of the state militia. On February 17, 1862, General McCulloch issued a proclamation from Fayetteville: 

Brigadier General N. B. Burrow, commander of the 3rd Brigade, 1st Division, Arkansas State Militia reacted by activating his entire brigade. According to pay records and muster rolls from the period, the following elements of the 3rd Brigade were activated in the face of the Union invasion of Northwest Arkansas:

 5th Militia Regiment, 3rd Militia Brigade, Crawford County, on duty 21 February -17 March,
 7th Militia Regiment, 3rd Militia Brigade, Franklin County, on duty 22 February -19 March,
 10th Militia Regiment, 3rd Militia Brigade, Johnson County, on duty 20 February -19 March
 51st Militia Regiment, 3rd Militia Brigade, Sebastian County, on duty 4 March - 19 March,
 58th Militia Regiment, 3rd Militia Brigade, Logan County, on duty 22 February - 21 March,
 62nd Militia Regiment, 3rd Militia Brigade, Johnson County, on duty 22 February - 1 March,

General Van Dorn received dispatches on February 22, from Generals McCullock and Price which indicated that General Price had rapidly fallen back from Springfield Missouri before a superior force of the enemy, and was endeavoring to form a junction with the division of General McCulloch in Boston Mountains, near Fayetteville. The State Military Board issued an order to Brigadier General George M. Holt, Commander of the 2nd Brigade of Arkansas Militia on February 26, to organize and put in camp each regiment in his militia brigade without delay. Brigadier General Burrow of the 3rd Militia Brigade, wrote from his headquarters at Van Buren to Governor Rector on March 2 informing the governor that he feared that only about 1,400 out of the 4,800 men enlisted in the brigade would report for duty. This estimate was based on the first returns from the units he had called out in response to Brigadier General McCulloch's call. Burrow indicated that reasons for this poor showing were that many had responded to General McCulloch's call by simply joining the existing volunteer regiments. Others had gone into hiding in the mountains in order to avoid militia duty. Finally some had joined the quartermaster department as teamsters and runners, and thus became exempt from militia duty, in order to escape combat.

On March 3, General Van Dorn reached the headquarters of Generals Price and McCulloch and on March 7–8 General Van Dorn's Army of the West engaged the Federal Army of the Southwest near Elk Horn Tavern in what would become known as the Battle of Pea Ridge. After initial success on the first day of the battle, Van Dorn was forced to order a retreat due to a lack of ammunition to continue the fight.

In response to the call of the State Military Board, elements of the 2nd Brigade, Arkansas Militia were mustered during and immediately following the Battle of Pea Ridge. The 50th Militia Regiment, of Prairie County, mustered March 7–9 while the 15th Militia Regiment, of Pope County mustered on 10–11 March. These are the only 2nd Brigade units for which pay roll records are available. H.W. Sholar of Greene County wrote to Governor Rector on 13 March, concerning Rector's recent call for 1,500 men to enlist in the militia. Scholar reported that companies were being raised in the county, but he complained that the men who refuse to enlist are threatened with death and "mob law" reigned in the county.

While General Van Dorn was fighting the Federals, Governor Rector was fighting attempts by the state legislature to abolish the Militia. The Legislature had been called into a special session beginning March 5, but the legislature lacked a quorum until 17 March when they began a 5-day session. Legislators who were tired of the high cost of attempting to maintain a separate state army sought to abolish the militia and passed an act to forbid Governor from paying Militia officers. The Legislature did appropriates $575,000 to implement current military law. Governor used a pocket veto to prevent the bill abolishing the militia and the bill forbidding him to pay Militia Officers from becoming law but signed the appropriation passed by the Legislature and used the funds to finance Militia activities.

Governor Rector attempts to organize a new State Army

Following his defeat at this battle, General Van Dorn initially retreated to Fort Smith and began moving his army back across the state in the direction of Jacksonport. Van Dorn originally intended to attempt an invasion of Missouri from Northeast Arkansas, but before he could begin such an operation, he received orders from General Albert Sydney Johnson directing him to move his army east of the Mississippi to assist with operations near Corinth, Mississippi. Van Dorn left the state with virtually every organized military unit and all the military stores and equipment that he could procure, once again leaving the State of Arkansas virtually defenseless in the face of a continued threat of invasion.

Furious with the authorities in Richmond, Governor Rector threatened to withdraw Arkansas from the Confederacy. Governor Rector issued an address on May 5, 1862, calling for the formation of 30 new infantry companies and 20 new cavalry companies. Rector indicated that if there were insufficient volunteers to fill these new companies, a draft would be made upon the militia regiments and brigades. As a further enticement, Rector also indicated that these regiments were for home defense and that they would not be transferred to Confederate Service without their consent.

General Hindman assumes command
Arkansas' Confederate congressional delegation joined Governor Rector in demanding defense for Arkansas, President Jefferson Davis in the summer of 1862 created the Trans-Mississippi District, made up of Arkansas, Louisiana, and Texas. Major General E. Kirby Smith was placed in command, with headquarters at Shreveport, Louisiana. Major General Thomas C. Hindman, a resident of Helena and a forceful commander, was named to command the forces in Arkansas in a Special Order issued by General Bragg on May 26, 1862. With Federal troops only  from Little Rock, Hindman was forced to take drastic measures. While on his way to Little Rock he had "impressed" $1 million from Memphis banks. At Helena he raided the stores, confiscating supplies ranging from medicine to ammunition, all of which he loaded on impressed steamboats. Of doubtful legality, these actions continued once Hindman reached Arkansas. Professor Michael Dougan has written that Hindman took "stores of all kinds" from citizens, even going so far as to raid the State Library to obtain paper for making cartridges. Finally, he burned thousands of bales of cotton to prevent their falling into enemy hands.

 Reaching Little Rock on May 30, 1862, General Hindman wasted no time in trying to correct the complicated situation in Arkansas. The general at once began to raise a new army. Facing the immediate threat of Federal occupation, General Hindman insisted that the State Military Board transfer all remaining state troops to Confederate service. Rector, having won the battle with Richmond and facing staggering costs in maintaining a state army, was in no position to refuse. On June 2, 1862, Rector issued a proclamation noting that it was "essential that but one military organization shall exist within the Trans-Mississippi Department" and transferred all state forces to Confederate command.

Relying upon a recently adopted Confederate conscription law, General Hindman drafted large numbers of men. To encourage volunteering, Hindman announced that if men formed themselves into volunteer companies by June 20, 1862, they would be permitted to elect their own company officers, instead of their officers being appointed by General Hindman. It is possible that this led to the aforementioned large number or enlistments from former militiamen into Volunteer Regiments in the summer of 1862.

During the spring and summer, many former militiamen joined one of the newly formed volunteer regiments. It may be that the militiamen decided it was better to enlist and remain together than to wait for forced conscription under new Confederate Conscription laws, which were being strictly enforced during the summer of 1862. In some cases, the Militia was ordered to assemble at their Regular Battalion Muster Grounds for the purpose of enrolling conscripts for service the Confederate Army. In many cases, names on the militia muster rolls from the February–March call up of the militia match subsequent enlistments in new Volunteer Regiments being raised in the spring and summer of 1862. A good example of this process is Company A of the 1st Arkansas Cavalry Regiment (Monroe's) which was enlisted at Hickory Plains, Prairie County, Arkansas, on May 9, 1862, by Captain Patrick Henry Wheat. Of the 97 members of this company who enlisted at Hickory Plains, 49 were present for the muster of the 50th Militia Regiment on March 7, 1862.

Home guard
Besides attempting to organize a strong force of regular Confederate troops, General Hindman used the conscription laws to create home guard units. The Confederate conscription statutes required that from 1864, boys of 17 years and men between 45 and 50 serve as a state defense reserve. On June 17, 1862, Hindman issued General Order Number Seventeen, providing that "for the more effectual annoyance of the enemy ... all citizens of this district, who are not subject to conscription, are called upon to organize themselves into independent companies." In the thoroughness that typified Hindman, he suggested the types of operations which the home guards should carry out: "Their duty will be to cut off Federal pickets, scouts, foraging parties, and trains, and to kill pilots and others on gun-boats and transports, attacking them day and night, and using the greatest vigor in their movements." Although the home guard units were similar to the militia, the Federals accused Hindman of legalizing bushwhacking. Many of the men who joined the home guards merely used the organization as an excuse to pillage isolated farms and villages. Northwest Arkansas, in particular, suffered at the hands of these guerilla bands.

The home guards proved to be popular with Confederate sympathizers in Arkansas, primarily because these units could not be sent out of the state without the consent of state authorities. While some of these groups did engage in informal guerrilla activities, others were well-organized and competently commanded. The Home Guard units continued to operate until the closing days of the war.

The fall of Little Rock
General Hindman proved a more effective organizer than a battlefield leader. His new army met defeat first at the Battle of Prairie Grove (December 7, 1962) and later at the Battle of Helena in July 1863. The state capitol, Little Rock, fell to advancing Union Forces on September 10, 1863. Arkansas Confederate forces continued to resist until the end of the war, and managed to inflict a few embarrassing Union defeats, notably at Battle of Jenkins' Ferry and Battle of Marks' Mills during the Red River Campaign of 1864. Many of the units which participated in these final battles of the conflict in Arkansas were raised as State Troops from the militia of southern Arkansas.

Militia operations after the fall of Little Rock
Governor Harris Flanagin (who had defeated Governor Rector in his re-election bid of 1862) began organizing a new force of state troops in the fall of 1863. Governor Flanagin appointed Gordon N. Peay to serve as his Adjutant General. Peay would serve in this capacity until the end of the war. Flanagin issued a proclamation on August 10, 1863, just a month before the capitol fell, announcing that he had been authorized to raise new regiments of state troops and that by special agreement these new units could not be transferred out of the state by Confederate authorities. After the fall of Little Rock, recruiting was far more difficult than it had been in the first years of the war. The constant transfer of Arkansas troops into the eastern theater of the war, across the Mississippi River from their homes, was a major objection by the remaining population of men eligible for military service. With Federal forces now occupying the state capitol, the Confederate state government had no way of enforcing conscription laws in the counties behind the Union lines, except during raids by Generals Price and Shelby in 1864. The remaining Confederate regiments were plagued by desertions.

On September 16, 1863, in the immediate aftermath of the fall of the state capitol, Governor Flanagin issued General Order No. 6 from Arkadelphia, which called into service the militia regiments of the counties of Clark, Hempstead, Sevier, Pike, Polk, Montgomery, La Fayette, Ouachita, Union, and Columbia in order to resist the Federal army. The Governor's order directed the regiments to march to Arkadelphia at the earliest possible day. Companies were to be mounted and commanders were to compel persons evading the call to come to the rendezvous. The intent was to form companies of twelve-month mounted volunteers. Only six physicians, one druggist, millers to supply the wants of the country, clerks, sheriffs, postmasters, and persons in the employ of the Confederate States were exempted from the order. In describing this call in a letter to General Holmes dated October 18, 1863, from Washington, Arkansas, the new Confederate state capitol, Flanagin stated that he issued the order calling out the militia, as an experiment, expecting to get volunteers. The order succeeded so well as to get companies organized in the counties where the call for the militia was enforced which resulted in seven companies being collected under the call. Flanagin also stated that "the troops raised by the State are more than double all the troops raised by volunteering, or by the conscript law, within the past few months".

On October 26, 1863, Governor Flanagin directed Adjutant General Peay to:

These new units of Arkansas State Troops were placed under the overall command of Col. William H. Trader who was detailed to Governor Flanagin by General E. Kirby Smith. Col. Trader remained in command of the state troops until he resigned in June 1864.

Pettus Battalion, Arkansas State Troops
On January 14, 1864, Governor Flanagin, through General Peay, issued General Orders, No. 8. which directed the following named companies of Arkansas mounted volunteers, which had been called into the service of the State under the proclamation of the August 10, A.D. 1863, compose and be designated as the 1st Battalion, Arkansas State Troops:
 Company A, of Hempstead County, Captain E. K. Williamson, commanding.
 Company B, of Clark County, Captain Reuben C. Reed, commanding.
 Company C, of Sevier County, Captain Allen T. Pettus, commanding.
 Company D, of Polk County, Captain G. A. Hale, commanding.
 Company E, of Hot Spring County, Captain John W. Dyer, commanding.

Allen T. Pettus was elected Lieutenant Colonel of this battalion. The unit participated in the battle of Marks Mill on April 25, 1864, as a part of Brigadier General William L. Cabell's Division. Lt. Col. Pettus was killed during the battle and Capt. P.K. Williamson of Company A commanded the battalion until the unit was increased to a regiment and transferred to Confederate service.

Newton's 10th Arkansas Cavalry Regiment
In August 1864 when the term of enlistment for these state troops was about to expire, Adjutant General Peay issued an order which directed that companies be allowed to vote on the subject of being transferred into Confederate service. However, the chance to vote on being transferred was merely a matter of form because Peay's order also had directions for those who refused transfer to Confederate service:

On September 5, 1864, the State Troop companies, including Pettus Battalion, were formed into one regiment of cavalry to be designated as the 3rd Regiment of Arkansas Cavalry, with Col. Robert C. Newton assigned to the command of the regiment until an election could be held for field officers. The companies of this regiment included:

 Company A—Capt. Reuben C. Reed, composed of men from Clark County
 Company B—Capt. Robert S. Burke, composed of men from Montgomery County
 Company C—Capt. Cyrus K. Holman (replaced Allen T. Pettus), composed of men from Sever County
 Company D—Capt. James B. Williamson, composed of men from Polk County
 Company E—Capt. Samuel Ogden (replaced P.K. Williamson), composed of men from Hempstead County
 Company F—Capt. Theophilus G. Henley, composed of men from Hempstead County
 Company G—Capt. George A. Hale, composed of men from Polk County
 Company H—Capt. William C. Corcoran, composed of men from Scott County
 Company I—Capt. Allen A. McDonald (replaced John W. Dyer), composed of men from Hot Spring County
 Company K—Capt. John Connally, composed of men from Pope County.

This unit was mustered into the Confederate Service on the October 31, 1864 as the 10th Arkansas Cavalry Regiment. Col. Newton was elected Regimental Commander. The unit operated in the Arkansas River Valley, interdicting the supply route between Little Rock and Fort Smith during the winter of 1864 to 1865.

The new unionist militia
In September 1863 Little Rock was captured by Union forces, and the Confederate state government fled to Washington, a town in Southwest Arkansas. From that point, effective Confederate control was limited to the southwest corner of the state. Home guard units and guerrilla bands continued to mount frequent raids. The Union government acted quickly to establish a loyal government in Little Rock.

That new loyal government was led by Isaac Murphy. Murphy had gained fame, and no small degree of hatred, by his firm refusal to vote for secession during the state secession convention. In early 1864 a convention was held in Little Rock to draft a unionist state constitution. On March 14 the document was approved by the available voters; Isaac Murphy was shortly thereafter elected governor.

Among Murphy's first acts was to call for the formation of a loyal state militia, as bushwhackers were running rampant in the state. On May 31, 1864, the legislature adopted Act Number Nineteen, which provided for the creation of "a loyal State militia." This legislation stipulated that "none but loyal and trustworthy men shall be permitted to bear arms in said organization." So that the legal militia could be easily separated from the guerrilla forces, the act required each militiaman to "wear, as a mark of distinction, and for the purpose of being recognized at a distance, a band of red cloth [three] inches in width, to be worn on their hats, or in the most  manner ..." Governor Murphy was authorized by the legislature to solicit 10,000 stands of arms from the Federal authorities to supply the militia force. Albert W. Bishop, a lieutenant colonel in the 1st Arkansas (Union) Cavalry, became Murphy's adjutant general.

Using United States Army officers to oversee recruitment, the new militia slowly took shape. Recruitment was most effective in strong unionist areas, especially northwest Arkansas, and in areas where a large Federal garrison could provide assistance. By the end of September 1864 militia drills were being held at Little Rock and Fort Smith as well as other points. In Little Rock, authorities ordered businesses to close during the three-hour weekly drills to encourage full attendance.

The rural areas of Northwest Arkansas, which experienced continual depredations by guerrilla forces, witnessed the formation of paramilitary organizations akin to, but different from, the Militia. Portions of the area had been stripped of productive farms, given the roaming bands of bushwhackers and Federal troops who frequently impressed food and supplies. Thus, a large percentage of the population faced starvation. As early as 1863, well before the formation of the Murphy government in Little Rock, Colonel M. LaRue Harrison, a Unionist commander and the man after whom the city of Harrison would be named, formed what came to be known as "Farm Colonies". These colonies would serve both a military and agricultural purpose. The colonies organized Militia companies composed entirely of farmers, which would be expected to cultivate the land and protect it.

Connection to the Arkansas National Guard
Current Arkansas Army National Guard units do not trace their lineage and honors to any of the units that participated in the Civil War. This is due in part to the lack of organization and poor record-keeping at the state level both before and after the war, and in part due to confusion over identification of units. In contrast to other southern states whose current National Guard units are awarded the campaign participate credits for their unit's participation in the various campaigns and engagements while in Confederate service, no current Arkansas National Guard unit has Campaign Participation Credit for the period of the Civil War.

See also

 Arkansas in the American Civil War
 List of Arkansas Civil War Confederate units
 List of Arkansas Union Civil War units

References

References
 Arkansas. (1860). Militia law of the state of Arkansas. Little Rock: Johnson & Yerkes, State Printers. 
 Arkansas Militia Heritage Preservation Foundation., Arkansas Militia Foundation., & Arkansas National Guard Historical Foundation. (1992). Arkansas military journal: A publication of the Arkansas Militia Heritage Preservation Foundation. North Little Rock, AR: Arkansas Militia Heritage Preservation Foundation. 
 Bearss, E. C. (1992). The battle of Wilson's Creek. Cassville, Mo: Litho Printers & Bindery.
 Bevens, W. E., & Sutherland, D. E. (1992). Reminiscences of a private: William E. Bevens of the First Arkansas Infantry, C.S.A. Fayetteville: University of Arkansas Press
 "Colonel Rieff Re-organizes Washington County Militia in 1860." Flashback, 5, No. 5 (October 1955): 33–35.
 Collier, C. L. (1961). First in—last out: The Capitol Guards, Ark. brigade. Little Rock: Pioneer Press. 
 Dougan, M. B. (1976). Confederate Arkansas: The people and policies of a frontier state in wartime. University, Ala: University of Alabama Press. 
 McRae, D. (n.d.). Dandridge McRae papers. 
 Oldham, K., Clayton, P., Conway, E. N., Flanagin, H., Murphy, I., Rector, H. M., & Arkansas. (1860). Kie Oldham papers.
 
 Smith, M. Aldridge. "Nicholas Bartlett Pearce and the Clamor of Commands in Benton County During the War of the Rebellion.'" Benton County Pioneer, 30 (Fall 1985): 33–39.
 Upton, E., Sanger, J. P., Beach, W. D., & Rhodes, C. D. (1916). The military policy of the United States. Washington: Govt. Print. Off. 
 U.S. War Department, The War of the Rebellion: a Compilation of the Official Records of the Union and Confederate Armies, U.S. Government Printing Office, 1880–1901.
 Woodruff, W.E. With the Light Guns in '61-'65: Reminiscences of Eleven Arkansas, Missouri and Texas Batteries in the Civil War. (Little Rock, AR: Central Printing Co., 1903).

External links
AR National Guard
AR Air National Guard
AR Army National Guard
The Arkansas National Guard Museum
Bibliography of Arkansas Army National Guard History compiled by the United States Army Center of Military History

Arkansas in the American Civil War
National Guard (United States)
Military in Arkansas
Military units and formations in Arkansas
Units and formations of the Confederate States Army from Arkansas
1865 disestablishments in Arkansas
Military units and formations disestablished in 1865